The 1972 NBA draft was the 26th annual draft of the National Basketball Association (NBA). The draft was held on April 10 and 15, 1972 before the 1972–73 season. In this draft, 17 NBA teams took turns selecting amateur U.S. college basketball players and other eligible players, including international players. The first two picks in the draft belonged to the teams that finished last in each conference, with the order determined by a coin flip. The Portland Trail Blazers won the coin flip and were awarded the first overall pick, while the Buffalo Braves were awarded the second pick. The remaining first-round picks and the subsequent rounds were assigned to teams in reverse order of their win–loss record in the previous season. As a result of last year's supplemental hardship draft, the Cincinnati Royals, the Atlanta Hawks, the Golden State Warriors and the Baltimore Bullets forfeited their first round picks, while the Los Angeles Lakers forfeited their fourth round pick. Prior to the start of the season, the Cincinnati Royals relocated and became the Kansas City-Omaha Kings. The draft consisted of 18 rounds comprising the selection of 198 players.

Draft selections and draftee career notes
A player who had finished his four-year college eligibility was eligible for selection. If a player left college early, he would not be eligible for selection until his college class graduated. Before the draft, eight college underclassmen were declared eligible for selection under the "hardship" rule, a similar case in which Spencer Haywood successfully argued in his court case against the NBA which allowed him to play in the NBA before his college class graduated. These players had applied and gave evidence of financial hardship to the league, which granted them the right to start earning their living by starting their professional careers earlier. This was the first draft where college underclassmen were allowed to enter.

LaRue Martin from Loyola University Chicago was selected first overall by the Portland Trail Blazers. Bob McAdoo, a college junior from the University of North Carolina, was selected second by the Buffalo Braves, and went on to win the Rookie of the Year Award in his first season. McAdoo, 10th pick Paul Westphal, and 12th pick Julius Erving have been inducted to the Basketball Hall of Fame, and Erving was also named to the list of the 50 Greatest Players in NBA History announced at the league's 50th anniversary in 1996. McAdoo was a 3-time NBA Scoring champion, and NBA championship with the Los Angeles Lakers in 1982 and 1985. He won the Most Valuable Player Award in 1975, had two All-NBA Team selections, and was a five-time All-Star. Erving had left college in 1971 to play professionally in the American Basketball Association (ABA) with the Virginia Squires. He joined the NBA in 1976 after both leagues merged, playing 11 seasons with the Philadelphia 76ers. An NBA champion in 1983, he was MVP in 1981, won three ABA Most Valuable Player Awards, was All-ABA five times and All-NBA seven, and an ABA All-Star five times and NBA All-Star eleven.

Paul Westphal, the 10th pick, was named All-NBA four times, an All-Star five, and on the 1974 NBA championship Boston Celtics. After retiring as a player, he went on to coach three NBA teams, most recently the Sacramento Kings. The 16th pick, Jim Price, and 34th pick, Don Buse, were also selected to an All-Star Game. Chris Ford, the 17th pick, won the NBA championship in 1981 with the Celtics. After retiring as a player, he went on to coach four NBA teams, including the Celtics. Ralph Simpson, the 11th pick, had left college in 1970 to play professionally in the ABA with Denver Rockets. He was selected to five ABA All-Star Games and four All-ABA Teams before he joined the NBA in 1976.

LaRue Martin is considered one of the biggest draft busts in NBA history. Martin only lasted four seasons in the league with a career scoring average of 5.3. Martin and eight other first-round picks all had insignificant contributions to the league; none of them had career scoring averages above 9 points per game and only one of them lasted more than six seasons in the NBA. Two of the first-round picks, Erving and Simpson, had already played in the ABA before the draft. They stayed there until both leagues merged in 1976 and only Simpson played for the team that he got drafted to.

In the tenth round, the Portland Trail Blazers selected Krešimir Ćosić from Brigham Young University with the 144th pick. However, he opted to play another season in college before returning to Yugoslavia in 1973. Ćosić, who was also selected in the fifth round of the 1973 Draft, had a successful career in Europe, winning numerous league and club titles, as well as six gold medals with the Yugoslavian national team. For his achievements, he has been inducted to the Basketball Hall of Fame. He has also been inducted by the International Basketball Federation (FIBA) to the FIBA Hall of Fame.

Key

Draft

Other picks
The following list includes other draft picks who have appeared in at least one NBA game.

Notable undrafted players
These players were not selected in the 1972 draft but played at least one game in the NBA.

Trades
 On April 7, 1972, the Phoenix Suns acquired the fourth pick from the Houston Rockets in exchange for Otto Moore. Previously, the Rockets acquired a first-round pick on December 10, 1971, from the Detroit Pistons in exchange for Jim Davis. The Suns used the pick to draft Corky Calhoun.
 On December 9, 1971, the Milwaukee Bucks acquired Curtis Perry and a first-round pick from the Houston Rockets in exchange for Greg Smith and 1973 third-round pick. The Bucks used the pick to draft Russ Lee.
 On April 2, 1971, the Detroit Pistons acquired a first-round pick from the Phoenix Suns in exchange for Otto Moore. The Pistons used the pick to draft Bob Nash.
 On October 13, 1971, the Los Angeles Lakers acquired a 1973 first-round pick, 1972 and 1973 second-round picks from the Cleveland Cavaliers in exchange for Rick Roberson. The Lakers used the pick to draft Jim Price.
 On November 25, 1971, the Seattle SuperSonics acquired 1972 and a future second-round picks from the Philadelphia 76ers in exchange for Bob Rule. The Sonics used the pick to draft Joby Wright.
 On November 11, 1970, the Los Angeles Lakers acquired a second-round pick from the Baltimore Bullets in exchange for John Tresvant. The Lakers used the pick to draft Paul Stovall.
 On November 15, 1971, the Cleveland Cavaliers acquired a second-round pick and a future pick from the New York Knicks in exchange for Luther Rackley. The Cavaliers used the pick to draft Steve Hawes.
 On the draft-day, the Baltimore Bullets acquired a second-round pick from the Phoenix Suns in exchange for Gus Johnson. The Bullets used the pick to draft Tom Patterson.
 On March 23, 1971, the Portland Trail Blazers acquired 1971 and 1972 second-round picks and a 1971 third-round pick from the Golden State Warriors (as the San Francisco Warriors) in exchange for Jim Barnett. The Blazers used the pick to draft Dave Twardzik.
 On November 9, 1971, the Cincinnati Royals acquired Jim Fox and a second-round pick from the Chicago Bulls in exchange for Norm Van Lier and a third-round pick. The Royals used the pick to draft Mike Ratliff. The Bulls used the pick to draft Frank Russell.
 On September 11, 1971, the Portland Trail Blazers acquired a second-round pick from the Los Angeles Lakers in exchange for LeRoy Ellis. The Blazers used the pick to draft Ollie Johnson.
 On August 13, 1971, the Phoenix Suns acquired 1972 and a future third-round picks from the Cleveland Cavaliers in exchange for Greg Howard. The Suns used the pick to draft Scott English.
 On October 12, 1969, the Cincinnati Royals acquired Wally Anderzunas and a third-round pick from the Cleveland Cavaliers in exchange for Dave Newmark. The Royals used the pick to draft Ron Riley.

Early entrants

College underclassmen
The following college basketball players successfully applied for an NBA hardship.

  Bob McAdoo – F/C, North Carolina (junior)
  Michael Reid - G, UC Riverside (junior)
  Brian Taylor - G, Princeton (junior)
  John Tinsley - F, Pfeiffer (freshman)
  Philmore Westbrook - G, Albemarle (freshman)

See also
 List of first overall NBA draft picks

References
General

Specific

External links
NBA.com
NBA.com: NBA Draft History

Draft
National Basketball Association draft
NBA draft
NBA draft
Basketball in New York City
Sporting events in New York City